The 2016 Kangaroo Cup was a professional tennis tournament played on outdoor hard courts. It was the twenty-first edition of the tournament and part of the 2016 ITF Women's Circuit, offering a total of $75,000+H in prize money. It took place in Gifu, Japan, on 2–8 May 2016.

Singles main draw entrants

Seeds 

 1 Rankings as of 25 April 2016.

Other entrants 
The following players received wildcards into the singles main draw:
  Mahiro Date
  Chihiro Muramatsu
  Miki Ukai
  Aiko Yoshitomi

The following players received entry from the qualifying draw:
  Tori Kinard
  Chihiro Nunome
  Akiko Omae
  Indy de Vroome

The following player received entry by a protected ranking:
  Miharu Imanishi

The following player received entry by a junior exempt:
  Dalma Gálfi

Champions

Singles

 Hiroko Kuwata def.  Wang Qiang, 6–2, 2–6, 6–4

Doubles

 Eri Hozumi /  Miyu Kato def.  Hiroko Kuwata /  Ayaka Okuno, 6–1, 6–2

External links 
 2016 Kangaroo Cup at ITFtennis.com
  

2016 ITF Women's Circuit
2016 in Japanese tennis
Kangaroo Cup